James George Beauregard-Smith (born 1943) is a convicted Australian rapist and murderer, serving a life prison sentence. Originally from Sydney, he moved to SA in 1975.

On 16 March 1978, the Supreme Court jury found Beauregard-Smith guilty of murdering nine-year-old Craig Alan Holland. Beauregard-Smith was having an affair with Sandra Holland, Craig Holland's mother, for several months before the murder.

The bodies of Sandra Holland and her eldest son, Scott, were found by police under trees and branches in Woodside. Craig Holland was found buried under the floorboards of the family home.

In August 1982, he fled custody while participating in an SES event near Renmark. An aboriginal tracker, Jimmy James, was asked to help find him. On 10 November 1992, Beauregard-Smith was sentenced to twelve months imprisonment for escaping custody.

On 8 April 1994, one week after his release from prison on parole, he raped a girl at Cudlee Creek in South Australia. On 15 November 1994 Beauregard-Smith was convicted of the rape and was sentenced to twelve years imprisonment, later reduced to eight years on appeal. Due to Beauregard-Smith being on parole when the rape was committed, his parole in the relation to the sentence for murder was revoked and he became liable to serve the balance of that sentence. A non-parole period of 15 years was set to begin 25 November 1994, the date when the applicant was sentenced in relation to the conviction for rape.

References

Australian people convicted of rape
Australian murderers of children
Australian prisoners sentenced to life imprisonment
Australian escapees
Living people
Prisoners sentenced to life imprisonment by South Australia
Escapees from South Australian detention
People convicted of murder by South Australia
Australian people convicted of murder
1977 murders in Australia
1994 crimes in Australia
Convict escapees in Australia
1943 births
1970s in South Australia